Kazimierz Leon Sapieha (1609–1656) was a nobleman of the Grand Duchy of Lithuania, a part of the Polish–Lithuanian Commonwealth, Royal Secretary and Grand Writer of Lithuania from 1631, Court Marshal of Lithuania from 1637, Deputy Chancellor of Lithuania from 1645.

Son of Lew Sapieha. Studied abroad. Sejm deputy in 1631. One of four executors of Władysław IV Waza's last will. Opponent of Janusz Radziwiłł; organized anti-Swedish resistance in Lithuania during The Deluge.

1609 births
1656 deaths
Kazimierz Leon
Deputy Chancellors of the Grand Duchy of Lithuania
Court Marshals of the Grand Duchy of Lithuania